Murder in the Cathedral is a 1962 Australian television play adapted from T. S. Eliot's 1935 play Murder in the Cathedral, about Thomas Becket.

William Sterling said he wanted to adapt it for TV for a long time. Australian TV drama was relatively rare at the time.

Cast
Wynn Roberts
Madeleine Howell
Kevin McBeath
Alan Tobin
Edward Brayshaw
Marcia Hart
Carole Potter

Reception
The critic for the Sydney Morning Herald though the production "went closer to justifying its two hours traffic... than anyone had a right to expect."

The Bulletin praised the acting but did not think the play was adapted particularly well for television.

References

External links
Murder in the Cathedral at IMDb

Australian television films
Adaptations of works by T. S. Eliot
Cultural depictions of Thomas Becket
Martyrdom in fiction
Films directed by William Sterling (director)